Liberty is an unincorporated community in Montgomery County, in the U.S. state of Ohio.

History
Liberty was platted in 1815. A post office called Liberty was established in 1814, and remained in operation until 1914.

References

Unincorporated communities in Montgomery County, Ohio
Unincorporated communities in Ohio